Stereopsis is the sole genus of fungi in the family Stereopsidaceae. The genus was formerly placed in the family Meruliaceae in the order Polyporales but was found to belong in its own order along with the genus Clavulicium. Stereopsis was circumscribed by English mycologist Derek Reid in 1965. It contains species that form funnel-shaped basidiocarps as well as the corticioid species Stereopsis globosa which was formerly considered a species of Clavulicium. The species Stereopsis humphreyi and Stereopsis vitellina were found to belong in the Agaricales and Atheliales respectively in a molecular phylogenetics study, and because of this do not belong in Stereopsis, but they have not yet been transferred to their own genera.

Species
Stereopsis burtiana
Stereopsis cartilaginea
Stereopsis crassipileata
Stereopsis gracilistipitata
Stereopsis hiscens
Stereopsis globosa
Stereopsis humphreyi
Stereopsis malaiensis
Stereopsis mussooriensis
Stereopsis nigripes
Stereopsis pseudocupulata
Stereopsis radicans
Stereopsis raphiae
Stereopsis reidii
Stereopsis sparassoides
Stereopsis straminea
Stereopsis vitellina

References

External links

Agaricomycetes
Agaricomycetes genera
Taxa described in 1965
Taxa named by Derek Reid